Ojeccasa (possibly from Quechua uqi lead, q'asa mountain pass, "lead pass") is a  mountain in the Chila mountain in the Andes of Peru. It is located in the Arequipa Region, Castilla Province, Choco District. Ojeccasa lies southeast of Quiscapampa.

References 

Mountains of Peru
Mountains of Arequipa Region